No. 180 Squadron RAF was a Royal Air Force squadron that flew medium bombers in World War II.

History

Formation in World War II
The Squadron was equipped with Mitchells at RAF West Raynham. It then flew its first raid from RAF Foulsham and suffered heavy losses including the aircraft of the squadron commander. After supporting the breakout from the Normandy beachhead in June 1944, the squadron re-located to Melsbroek, Belgium. It supported the allied advance across Europe and from April 1945 it operated from Achmer, Germany.

Post war
The Mitchell aircraft were replaced with Mosquitos in September 1945 and the squadron moved to Wahn. It was disbanded upon re-numbering as No. 69 Squadron RAF on 31 March 1946.

Aircraft operated

References

External links
 
 
 

180
Military units and formations established in 1942